is a Japanese voice actress who works for Production Ace.

Filmography

Anime
 Black Blood Brothers as Kelly Wong
 D.N.Angel as Yuki Suzaki 
 Grenadier - The Senshi of Smiles as Touka Kurenai
 Kiddy Grade as Bonita Gerard 
 Kimi ga Nozomu Eien as Motoko Kouzuki
 Lucky Star as Yukari Takara
 Melody of Oblivion as Tamakorogashi
 Nichijou as Izumi Sakurai
 Seitokai no Ichizon as Satori Magiru
 Tokimeki Memorial 2 as Kotoko Minazuki
 The World of Narue as Bathyscaphe

Drama CDs 
 Sakurazawa vs Hakuhou series 1: Shokuinshitsu de Naisho no Romance (Izumi)

External links 
 Official agency profile 
 Mami Kosuge at Ryu's Seiyuu Infos
 

Year of birth missing (living people)
Living people
Japanese video game actresses
Japanese voice actresses